Ronald Friest (born November 4, 1958) is a Canadian former professional ice hockey player who played 64 games in the National Hockey League (NHL) with the Minnesota North Stars between 1981 and 1983.

Career statistics

Regular season and playoffs

External links
 

1958 births
Living people
Baltimore Clippers (1979–81) players
Canadian ice hockey left wingers
Flint Generals players
Ice hockey people from Ontario
Minnesota North Stars players
Nashville South Stars players
Niagara Falls Flyers players
Oklahoma City Stars players
Sportspeople from Windsor, Ontario
Undrafted National Hockey League players
Windsor Spitfires players